The Sensations were a Jamaican vocal group which performed backing on many of the reggae hits of the late 1960s and early 1970s. Membership was fluid but centred on the original members Jimmy Riley, Cornel Campbell, Buster Riley and Aaron "Bobby" Davis.

They released "Just One Smile" as a single in 1969.

References

Jamaican ska groups
Jamaican reggae musical groups
Rocksteady musical groups